The Louisville Ballet is a ballet school and company based in Louisville, Kentucky and is the official state ballet of The Commonwealth of Kentucky. It is led by artistic and executive director  Robert Curran, an Australian dancer and choreographer.

History
The Louisville Ballet was founded in 1952 and it achieved professional status and admitted its first students in 1975. It is the only regional company with which Mikhail Baryshnikov has performed in repertoire productions (He danced with the company during the 1978–79 and 1979–80 seasons).

The Ballet has more than 60 world premieres to its credit, with a repertoire of about 150 pieces choreographed by the likes of Sir Frederick Ashton, Erik Bruhn, George Balanchine, Antony Tudor, John Cranko, Kurt Jooss, Choo San Goh, Jose Limon, Paul Taylor, and others.

Governance and description
 the company is led by executive director Philip Koester and artistic director Robert Curran, formerly rehearsal director with Bangarra Dance Theatre in Australia and principal dancer with the Australian Ballet.

The company presents several full-length ballets each year, which have included Swan Lake, The Sleeping Beauty, Coppelia, Romeo and Juliet, Cinderella, Giselle and Don Quixote. In addition to the regular subscription series, the Louisville Ballet presents The Nutcracker each winter holiday season in association with the Brown-Forman Corporation.

Most of the company's productions are accompanied by the Louisville Orchestra. The company performs at three venues in the city: The Brown Theatre, The Kentucky Center, and, occasionally, The Louisville Palace.

The Louisville Ballet School is the official school and training center connected with the Louisville Ballet. The Louisville Ballet Youth Ensemble is the student performing group of the School.

Alumni of the Ensemble have gone on to dance professionally with the Alvin Ailey American Dance Theater, American Ballet Theatre, Aspen Santa Fe Ballet, New York City Ballet, Peridance, Sarasota Ballet, and others.

The school also hosts a summer camp for aspiring dancers.

Building
The Louisville Ballet building, designed by Louisville architects Bravura Corporation, is a $2.2 million facility built in 1995 houses two large rehearsal studios and administrative offices. The Louisville Ballet Center received the Honor Award for Excellence in Architectural Design by the Kentucky chapter of the American Institute of Architects and was featured in the May 1997 edition of Architecture. It is located at 315 East Main St. in downtown Louisville.

References

External links

Arts organizations based in Louisville, Kentucky
Ballet schools in the United States
Ballet companies in the United States
Arts organizations established in 1952
1952 establishments in Kentucky
Education in Louisville, Kentucky
Performing arts in Kentucky